Pat English is an Irish former hurler who played at senior level for the Carlow county team. He is former manager of the Carlow senior team.

Born in Ballinkillin, County Carlow, English first played competitive hurling in his youth. He played senior hurling with Carlow, and was a member of the team that won the All-Ireland title in the "B" grade in 1992. At club level English played with Ballinkillen.

His father, Jim English, was a three-time All-Ireland medallist and an All-Ireland-winning-captain with Wexford.

In retirement from playing English became involved in team management and coaching. He took charge of a number of club teams before being appointed manager of the Carlow senior team on 22 September 2014, having previously taken charge of the Carlow under-21 team.

Career statistics

Manager

References

Living people
Carlow inter-county hurlers
Hurling managers
Hurling selectors
Ballinkillen hurlers
Year of birth missing (living people)